The Barbados national rugby sevens team is a minor national sevens side. They competed at the Commonwealth Sevens in 2014 replacing Nigeria who withdrew despite qualifying. Barbados also participated in the World Series core team qualifiers at the 2014 Hong Kong Sevens.

The team received some publicity in 2014, when Anthony Bayne-Charles, the son of Billy Ocean, was selected to play for them as a reserve.

Players

Fromer squads 
Squad that participated at the 2014 Hong Kong Sevens World Series Qualifier.

Shaun English
Marcus Harewood
Dominic Peters
Leo Donnelly
Adam Mings
Tom Lucas
Jae Bowen
Mike Phillips
Leon Driscoll
Sean Ward
Dwight Forde
Jamahl Hunte

See also
 Rugby union in Barbados

References

 2014 Commonwealth Games Rugby Sevens Schedule
 2014 Commonwealth Games Rugby Sevens Schedule

Rugby union in Barbados
National rugby sevens teams
rugby union sevens